Wilhelm von Christ (2 August 1831 – 8 February 1906) was a German classical scholar.

Biography
He was born in Geisenheim in Hesse-Nassau.  From 1854 till 1860 he taught in the Maximiliansgymnasium at Munich, and in 1861 was appointed professor of classical philology at the University of Munich.

Work
His most important works are:
Die metrische Ueberlieferung der pindarischen Oden (1868)
Geschichte der griechischen Literatur (5th ed., 1908 f.), a history of Greek literature down to the time of Justinian, one of the best works on the subject; after Christ died, this work was revised by Wilhelm Schmid
Metrik der Griechen und Römer (1879)
editions of Pindar (1887)
edition of the Poetika of Aristotle (1878)
Attikusausgabe des Demosthenes (1882)
edition of the Metaphysica of Aristotle (1895)
Iliad (1884)
His contributions to the Sitzungsberichte und Abhandlungen of the Bavarian Academy of Sciences are particularly valuable.

In 1886, Wilhelm Christ was the first who put forward the theory that the so-called Sea Peoples are identical with Plato's Atlanteans.  Later, this thesis was repeated under varying perspectives by scholars and researchers such as Theodor Gomperz, Spyridon Marinatos, Jürgen Spanuth, John V. Luce, or Herwig Görgemanns.

Further reading
 Otto Crusius, Gedächtnisrede (“Memorial talk [on Wilhelm von Christ]”; Munich, 1907).

Notes

References 
 
Attribution

External links
 

1831 births
1906 deaths
German classical scholars
German philologists
Academic staff of the Ludwig Maximilian University of Munich
People from Rheingau-Taunus-Kreis